The production of wine often includes a process called fining (or "clarifying"), in which fining agents are added to wine to remove proteins, yeast, and other suspended organic particles, and later filtered out. Fining agents can be either animal, carbon, or clay-based. Animal-based fining agents include gelatin, isinglass, egg white (albumen), and casein.

Since the fining agent is filtered back out of the wine, the labeling of these additives is not required or regulated in most places. However, the use of animal-derived additives in wine production is a matter of ethical concern in vegetarianism and veganism.

Non-vegetarian/vegan additives

Examples of common animal products used as fining agents are gelatin, isinglass, casein, and egg albumen. Dried bull's blood was also used in some Mediterranean countries but, as a legacy of bovine spongiform encephalopathy, is not allowed in the U.S. or the European Union.

Gelatin 
The most common animal product used for fining is gelatin, due to its potency and effectiveness. Gelatin is made from the boiling of animal parts. Wine specifically responds best to type A gelatin, which is derived from the boiling of pig's skin. It takes only one ounce of gelatin to clarify 1,000 gallons of wine. Gelatin is used in both white and red wines to fix haze/color and to adjust the flavor or bitterness of the wine.

Isinglass 
Isinglass is derived from fish bladders. It is primarily used to clear white wines. Like gelatin, isinglass needs to be used sparingly to prevent residual traces in the wine due to its potency.

Casein 
Casein is the main protein found in cow's milk. It makes up 80% of the proteins and is derived by first skimming milk of its fat, then a process of precipitation to separate remaining particles of the milk and in the end be left with casein proteins. Casein is used in both red and white wines to clarify and treat and prevent oxidization.

Egg Albumen 
Egg albumen are the whites of a raw chicken egg. It is most commonly used in the clarification of red wines to remove excess tannins.

Vegan and vegetarian alternative fining agents 
As an alternative to animal products, carbon, bentonite, a clay mineral, and polyvinylpolypyrrolidone are the most common to be used to clarify wine. In Australia, winemakers are required to list the use of potential allergens such as casein and albumin on the label. Still, they are not obliged to list the use of other animal-based fining agents such as gelatin or isinglass.  In the EU, regulations only stipulate that wines fined using milk or egg products (both allergens) must be clearly labelled. 

Some winemakers believe that fining removes desirable flavours and aromas and instead let the wine's sediments settle naturally, which is a time-consuming process. Natural wines are a growing trend, which are unfiltered by their very nature.

Labeling requirements 
It is not required for products to disclose whether they are vegan/vegetarian or not. Even products that choose to label their products with titles, are not required to show proof that they are free of animal byproducts, animal testing, or any form of animal exploitation. In the United States, it is not required that alcohol labels disclose even major allergens. There was a proposal submitted by the Tax and Trade Bureau in 2006 to mandate the labeling of major allergens such as milk, eggs, and fish included in the production of wine (whether it is filtered out or not).

in 2011, Dr. Emilia Vassilopoulou published a study conducted by herself and her colleagues in an attempt to determine if allergens (milk, egg, and fish products used as fining agents) should be labeled on the packaging of the product. Their goal was to find, in a controlled environment, if people with certain allergens would have reactions after drinking wine that had been fined with said allergen. The findings showed no reactions through in-vitro methods, but had positive skin pricks tests in patients who consumed/were allergic to wines fined with milk, fish, and eggs. The findings were so minimal that they agreed that the labeling is not necessary. However, this does prove that there are still particles of these animal proteins leftover in the wine.

See also
 Glossary of wine terms
 Wine
 Vegetarianism and beer

References

External links
 VegNews Vegan Wine Guide
 Barnivore.com – Vegan Alcohol Directory
 VegNews Vegan Wines 101
 Goodwill Wine — Vegan Wine Info

Vegetarianism and drinks
Vegetarianism